Casuaria crumena is a species of snout moth in the genus Casuaria. It was described by Cajetan Felder, Rudolf Felder and Alois Friedrich Rogenhofer in 1875, and is known from Colombia.

References

Moths described in 1875
Chrysauginae
Taxa named by Alois Friedrich Rogenhofer